Rimapenaeus is a genus of prawns. It comprises six species, including the "roughneck shrimp", Rimapenaeus constrictus:
Rimapenaeus byrdi (Burkenroad, 1934)
Rimapenaeus constrictus (Stimpson, 1871)
Rimapenaeus faoe (Obarrio, 1954)
Rimapenaeus fuscina (Pérez Farfante, 1971)
Rimapenaeus pacificus (Burkenroad, 1934)
Rimapenaeus similis (Smith, 1885)

References

Penaeidae
Crustaceans of the Atlantic Ocean